Chionarctia pura is a moth of the family Erebidae. It was described by John Henry Leech in 1899. It is found in the Chinese provinces of Shaanxi, Sichuan, Guizhou and Yunnan.

References

Spilosomina
Moths described in 1899